The girls' halfpipe competition of the snowboarding events at the 2012 Winter Youth Olympics in Innsbruck, Austria, was held between January 14 and 15, at Kühtai. 16 athletes from 13 different countries took part in this event.

Results

Qualification
The qualification was started on 14 January at 11:30. The three best snowboarders  qualified for the final (QF) and the six snowboarders qualified for the semifinal (QSF).

Semifinal
The semifinal was started on 15 January at 09:30. The three best snowboarderst qualified for the final (QF).

Final
The final was started on 15 January at 12:00.

References 

Girls' halfpipe